is a Japanese fencer. She competed in the women's individual and team foil events at the 1964 Summer Olympics.

References

External links
 

1932 births
Living people
Japanese female foil fencers
Olympic fencers of Japan
Fencers at the 1964 Summer Olympics